Zorrati may refer to:
 Zorrati, Hormozgan
 Zorrati, Sistan and Baluchestan